Guillermo Eduardo Capetillo de Flores (born 30 April 1958) is a Mexican actor, singer and matador.

Family
Capetillo was born in Mexico City, and is a member of the Capetillo family. His father (Manuel Capetillo, Sr.) (1926-2009) and his brother, actor Manuel Capetillo, Jr. are also matadors, his brother Eduardo Capetillo is a singer and actor. He was married to television presenter Tania Amezcua Riquenes from 2006 to 2009.

Guillermo acquired notoriety on the worldwide famous telenovela Los Ricos También Lloran (1979), where he played the role of Verónica Castro's son. He also acted with Castro in Rosa Salvaje (in which he played Castro's lover Ricardo and brother in law Rogelio) and Pueblo chico, infierno grande.

Telenovelas

Films 

Si Nos Dejan (1999)
Quisiera Ser Hombre (1988)
La Mafia Tiembla (1986)
Ases del Contrabando (1985)
El Hijo de Pedro Navaja (1985)
Novia, Esposa y Amante (1981)

Albums 
 Una vez más el amor (1987)
 Mujer (1982)

External links 
 Guillermo Capetillo at the Telenovela database.

1958 births
Living people
Male actors from Mexico City
Mexican bullfighters
Mexican male film actors
Mexican male telenovela actors
Mexican people of Spanish descent
Singers from Mexico City
20th-century Mexican male singers